Louis Parker may refer to:

 Louis N. Parker (1852–1944), English dramatist, composer and translator
 Louis W. Parker (1906–1993), Hungarian-American inventor